Khovrino District is an administrative district (raion), one of the sixteen in Northern Administrative Okrug of the federal city of Moscow, Russia. It is located along the Likhoborka River.  The area is   As of the 2010 Census, the total population of the district was 80,792.

History
The name of the district comes from that of a former village, known since the 15th century as an estate of a Surozh prince Stefan Gabras nicknamed "Khovra" (hence the name). In the late 19th century, Khovrino was owned by the Grachyov family of manufacturers. In 1960, Khovrino was engulfed by Moscow.

Municipal status
As a municipal division, it is incorporated as Khovrino Municipal Okrug.

Landmarks
 Hovrinskaya Hospital (1985-2018)

References

Notes

Sources

Districts of Moscow
Northern Administrative Okrug